Bottled oxygen is oxygen in small, portable, high pressure storage cylinders, as used for high-altitude climbing. Bottled oxygen may also be for a breathing gas, especially for scuba diving or during surgery. (see also diving cylinder and oxygen tank)

High-altitude climbing (mountaineering) usually requires the use of portable oxygen apparatus when climbing Mount Everest or the other eight-thousanders, though some mountaineers have ascended Everest without oxygen. The apparatus can be open-circuit (supplementary) or closed-circuit; the 1953 British Mount Everest expedition used both types.

1920s and 1930s  
British expeditions all used open-circuit oxygen apparatus, as advocated by pioneer climbers George Finch, Noel Odell and Peter Lloyd. Open-circuit oxygen apparatus was trialled on the 1922 and 1924 British Everest expeditions; the bottled oxygen taken by the 1921 expedition  was not used. The carrying frame used in 1922 and 1924 with four cylinders of oxygen or “gas” weighed a “hefty” 32 lb (14.5 kg), though climbers sometimes (e.g. the last climb of Mallory and Irvine) carried only two cylinders each.  Four cylinders contained a total of 960 litres of oxygen, which would last for eight hours at the standard rate of 2 litres per minute or seven hours at 2.2 L/min.

The 1938 British Mount Everest expedition trialled closed-circuit as well as open-circuit apparatus, but the closed-circuit apparatus was not successful.

First ascent of Everest  
In 1953 the first assault party of Tom Bourdillon and Charles Evans used closed-circuit oxygen apparatus which had been developed by Bourdillon and his father, and returned expired oxygen to the breathing bag.  The successful second assault party of Ed Hillary and Tenzing Norgay used open-circuit oxygen apparatus; after ten minutes taking photographs on the summit without his oxygen set on, Hillary said he "was becoming rather clumsy-fingered and slow-moving". 

John Hunt wrote that two assault parties using the experimental closed-circuit type was too risky despite users having achieved a faster climbing rate and also potentially having a greater range for a given supply (so that it might be possible to reach the summit from a camp on the South Col).  Hence he proposed one closed-circuit assault followed shortly by an open-circuit assault (and a third assault if necessary). The cylinders used were dural light-alloy cylinders holding 800 litres or RAF steel wire-wound cylinders holding 1,400 litres of oxygen (both at 3,300 p.s.i.; 227.5 bar or 22.75 MPa). The expedition had 8 closed-circuit and 12 open-circuit sets; the open-circuit set used 1 RAF cylinder or 1,2 or 3 dural cylinders; with total set weight 28 lb, 18 lb, 29lb or 41 lb (12.7, 8.2, 13.4 or 18.6 kg). Sleepers above  used "night oxygen" at 1 litre/minute; and with adaptors they could use oxygen from tanks by Drägerwerk the Swiss had left behind in 1952. Both open-circuit and closed-circuit sets iced up; the closed-circuit sets when a new and cold soda-lime canister was inserted.

Physiologist Griffith Pugh had also been on the 1952 British Cho Oyu expedition to study the effects of cold and altitude.
The more oxygen breathed the greater the subjective benefit
The weight to a large extent offset increased performance
The minimum required was a flow rate of 4 litres/minute. Prewar 1 then briefly (1 or 2 minutes) 2 litres/minute (1924; Odell etc.) or 2.25 litres/minute (1922 Finch & Bruce) & (1938, Lloyd & Warren) had been used 
 There was a great reduction in pulmonary ventilation 
There was a great relief in the feeling of heaviness and fatigue in the legs (although it was not tested whether endurance was improved).
They also noted a great variation between individuals with some men not able to go above ,  probably only exceptional men able to go above  without supplemental oxygen, and few men can go above  twice in an expedition. Performance was somewhat better than anticipated from 1952; the principal effect was to increase the work done in a day, and great improvement in their subjective state so having greater appreciation of the surroundings. The sense of well-being continued for an hour or more after oxygen was discontinued. Pugh also recommended acclimatising above  for at least 36 days, and the use of closed-circuit equipment.

Post-Everest 1953 

On 8 May 1978,  Reinhold Messner and Peter Habeler made the first ascent of Mount Everest without supplemental oxygen. Messner had ascended all 14 "eight-thousanders" without supplemental oxygen by 1986.

Running out of bottled oxygen was noted as a factor in the 1979 deaths of Ray Genet and Hannelore Schmatz on Mount Everest.

By the 21st century one of the popular oxygen systems on Mount Everest used carbon-fiber reinforced aluminum bottles, with a 3-liter container of oxygen weighing 7 pounds (3.2 kg) when filled up at 3000 psi (207 bar or 20.7 MPa).

By the late 2010s, theft of oxygen bottles from camps had become increasingly common. Empty or spent oxygen tanks are among the "waste" items left on Mount Everest.

See also

 

 (HAPE)
Commercial climbing in Mount Everest

References

External links
Oxygen Mask
Oxygen
Climbing equipment
Mountaineering equipment